Jamesville is an unincorporated community in northeast Stone County, Missouri, United States. The community is located just west of the confluence of Finley Creek and the James River, along Missouri Route M.

The historic Jamesville School was located along Finley Creek to the east of the settlement.

References

External links
Historic Jamesville, Missouri: A Personal Perspective Video by MSU (Aired: 12/18/2011)

Unincorporated communities in Stone County, Missouri
Unincorporated communities in Missouri